OpenWGA is a Content Management System (CMS) running on the Java Enterprise Edition Platform. It is used to build, manage and publish websites and content-centric web applications. The system is developed and maintained by German company Innovation Gate GmbH.

Components and Editions of the CMS platform 

The central part of the platform is the OpenWGA Server, a web server process responsible for publishing web applications. It itself is a web application of the Java Enterprise Edition Platform and is available in two editions:

 The Community Edition contains the content publishing engine, support for storing content data on MySQL, PostgreSQL, Microsoft SQL Server and HSQLDB databases and includes basic capabilities for user authentication. It is licensed as Open Source Software under GNU GPLv3 or higher and usable without fee. A special exception to the GNU GPL allows distribution of custom-licensed OpenWGA plugins along with the OpenWGA server.
 The Enterprise Edition builds upon the Community Edition to add support for database platforms (Lotus Domino, IBM DB2, Oracle Database), user authentication systems (LDAP directory servers, multiple shared authentication) and external data sources (CMIS repositories, Lotus Domino Databases) that are considered "enterprise grade" by the product creators. It consists of the GPL licensed community edition plus a custom-licensed "Enterprise Plugin" containing the additional features. Access to the Enterprise Edition is available via a paid subscription model by Innovation Gate GmbH.

Another part of the platform is the OpenWGA developer studio, an Integrated development environment for developing and testing OpenWGA web applications, based on the Eclipse IDE framework.

History 

OpenWGA was long time developed under the name of  WGA and was by this time a commercial Web Content Management System only available to the German market. With releasing it under Open Source License it was rebranded to OpenWGA. The acronym originally stood for "WebGate Anywhere", containing a reference to the predecessor software "Webgate", a CMS running on the IBM Lotus Domino Platform. The WGA/OpenWGA software has no connection with Windows Genuine Advantage, also known as WGA.

Content management characteristics 

OpenWGA provides the following characteristic features known in content management and publishing:

 Hierarchically organized, versionable, multi language content in a freely definable structure
 Storage of binary content data along with content
 Automatic fulltext indexing of content
 Browser-based WYSIWYG content authoring
 Configurable read/write authorisations on multiple levels: Application, Hierarchy, Document
 Approval Workflow
 Web service access to content data via RESTful HTTP webservice, CMIS, SOAP and WebDAV
 Synchronisation of Content Data across servers
 User personalisation via individual user profiles

Template / Application development 

OpenWGA uses its own templating languages called WebTML and TMLScript. WebTML is a syntax of XML-formatted tags, prefixed with "tml:", that mark dynamic parts of page templates, providing mainly data output and flow control beside offering higher level features. TMLScript is an expression language used to specify expressions and define routines in WebTML that complies to the rules of JavaScript Version 1.6.

The following example demonstrates the usage of WebTML and TMLScript (inside the "condition" attribute) in a HTML page template:

  <tml:meta name="title"/>
  
  <tml:case condition="!isEmpty('abstract')">
    <div id="abstract">
      <tml:item name="abstract" editor="rtf"/>
    </div>
  </tml:case>
  
  <div id="body">
    <tml:item name="body" editor="rtf"/> 
  </div>

The design of an OpenWGA web application is either provided as OpenWGA design directory for direct editing or as an OpenWGA plugin for wider distribution.

See also 

 List of content management systems

References

External links 
 Official Homepage
 Homepage of Innovation Gate GmbH

Free content management systems
Java platform software